Hong Kong Schools Sports Federation football team was a football team established by Hong Kong Schools Sports Federation and formed by students from Hong Kong secondary schools. They last competed in Hong Kong Third District Division League before it was dissolved in the 2011–12 season.

Seasons Records

References

External links
 HKFA.com HKSSF Club Information
 Hong Kong Inter-School Athletics Competition

HKSSF